Cuxham is an English village in the civil parish of Cuxham with Easington in South Oxfordshire.

Parish church
The Church of England parish church of the Holy Rood has a Norman bell tower. The Gothic windows on the north side of the nave were inserted in the 14th century and some of the windows in the tower were added in the 15th century. The windows on the south side of the nave were probably inserted in the 17th century and the church was heavily restored in the 18th century. The Gothic Revival architect C.C. Rolfe rebuilt the chancel in 1895. The Rectory is Georgian and was built about 1800. Since 1983 Holy Rood has been part of a united benefice with Easington, Brightwell Baldwin and Ewelme.

Mills
The Domesday Book of 1086 recorded three watermills at Cuxham. The present Cuxham Mill was built in about the middle of the 18th century on the site of one of those recorded in the Domesday Book. It was held by the Benedictine Wallingford Priory before Merton College, Oxford acquired the Manor of Cuxham in about 1268–71. In the Middle Ages, Cutt Mill was the manorial corn mill. The present mill on the site was built in the middle of the 18th century.

Amenities
The Half Moon public house was built in the 17th century and extended in the 18th. It is built of chalk rubble with brick quoins. Recently modernised, it is now a pizzeria and gastropub.

References

Sources

External links

Villages in Oxfordshire
South Oxfordshire District